The Lima News is a local daily newspaper aimed at residents in Allen, Auglaize, Hancock, Hardin, Logan, Mercer, Putnam, Shelby and Van Wert counties in Ohio, USA. Its headquarters are located in Lima, Ohio. It was first printed on July 21, 1926.

The paper was owned by Freedom Communications, a privately held California-based company whose flagship paper is the Orange County Register, until 2012, when it was sold to Ohio Community Media, an affiliate of the private equity firm Versa Capital Management. Under Freedom Communications' ownership, The Lima News took a libertarian editorial position on issues.

In 2012, Versa merged Ohio Community Media, the Freedom papers it had acquired, Impressions Media and Heartland Publications into a new company, Civitas Media. Civitas Media sold its Ohio papers to AIM Media Midwest in 2017.

References

External links

 Limaohio.com
 Official mobile website

Newspapers published in Ohio
Lima, Ohio
1926 establishments in Ohio